Marquess of Ardales is an hereditary title in the Peerage of Spain, granted in 1559 by Philip II to Luis de Guzmán, 2nd Count of Teba and Marshall of Castile. The name refers to the town of Ardales in Málaga.

Marquesses of Ardales (1559)

Luis de Guzmán y Córdoba, 1st Marquess of Ardales
Juan Ramírez de Guzmán y Álvarez de Toledo, 2nd Marquess of Ardales
Brianda de Guzmán y de la Vega, 3rd Marchioness of Ardales
Luis de Guzmán y Guzmán, 4th Marquess of Ardales
Pedro Andrés de Guzmán Enríquez de Rivera y Acuña, 5th Marquess of Ardales
Luis Francisco Ramírez de Guzmán y Fernández de Córdoba, 6th Marquess of Ardales
Pedro de Guzmán y Portocarrero, 7th Marquess of Ardales
Agustín de Guzmán y Portocarrero, 8th Marquess of Ardales
Cristóbal Portocarrero de Guzmán Henriquez de Luna, 9th Marquess of Ardales
Catalina Portocarrero de Guzmán, 10th Marchioness of Ardales
Domingo Fernández de Córdoba, 11th Marquess of Ardales
María del Carmen Fernández de Córdoba, 12th Marchioness of Ardales
Luis Fernández de Córdoba y Portocarrero, 13th Marquess of Ardales
Eugenio de Palafox y Portocarrero, 14th Marquess of Ardales
Cipriano de Palafox y Portocarrero, 15th Marquess of Ardales
María Eugenia de Palafox y Kirkpatrick, 16th Marchioness of Ardales
Jacobo Fitz-James Stuart y Falcó, 17th Marquess of Ardales 
Jaime de Mitjans y Fitz-James Stuart, 18th Marquess of Ardales
Carlos Alfonso de Mitjans y Fitz-James Stuart, 19th Marquess of Ardales
María de los Reyes de Mitjans y Verea, 20th Marchioness of Ardales

See also
House of Guzmán

References

Marquesses of Spain
Lists of Spanish nobility
Noble titles created in 1559